Li Qinglong (born August 1962) is a Chinese pilot selected as part of the Shenzhou program.

Biography
Li Qinglong was born in Dingyuan, Anhui province, China. In 1987 he graduated from the People's Liberation Army Air Force (PLAAF) Missile College and later the PLAAF Flight College. A fighter pilot in the PLAAF, he had accumulated 1230 flight-hours.

In November 1996, he and Wu Jie, started training at the Russian Yuri Gagarin Cosmonauts Training Center. When they returned to China a year later, they acted as the trainers for the first group of astronauts. In January 2003 it was reported by a Hong Kong newspaper that Chen Long would make the first manned Shenzhou flight. Then in March 2003, it was reported that Li Qinglong would make the first manned flight. It was thought that "Chen Long" was a misspelling of "Qinglong", a fact confirmed by the newspaper a couple of days before the launch of Shenzhou 5, which was flown by Yang Liwei.

References

1962 births
Living people
People's Liberation Army Astronaut Corps
Shenzhou program astronauts
People's Liberation Army Air Force personnel